San Juan del Río Coco is a town and a municipality in the Madriz department of Nicaragua.

External links
San Juan del Río Coco (Photos by Steven Broome) 
San Juan del Rio Coco, Madriz, Nicaragua (Spanish)

References 

Municipalities of the Madriz Department